Voss Station is a railway station on the Bergen Line located in the village of Vossevangen in the municipality of Voss in Vestland county, Norway.  It sits just off the European route E16 highway on the northwestern shore of the lake Vangsvatnet.

The station was opened as the original terminal station of the Voss Line in 1883. It is served by express trains to Bergen and Oslo, and the Bergen Commuter Rail, all operated by Vy Tog. Most commuter trains terminate at Voss, but up to seven per day continue on to Myrdal.

The station restaurant was taken over by Norsk Spisevognselskap on 15 October 1947.

The rail station contains the lower terminus of the Voss Gondol gondola system.

References

External links

 Jernbaneverket's page on Voss

Railway stations in Voss
Railway stations on Bergensbanen
Railway stations opened in 1883
1883 establishments in Norway